Aigner is a German surname. Notable people with the surname include:

Andreas Aigner (born 1984), Austrian rally driver
Barbara Aigner (born 2005), Austrian para alpine skier
Chrystian Piotr Aigner (1756–1841), Polish architect
Ernst Aigner (born 1966), retired Austrian footballer
Etienne Aigner (1904–2002), Hungarian-born German fashion designer, and existing Fashion House of same name (Etienne Aigner AG)
Franz Aigner (footballer) (born 1967), retired Austrian football player and a football manager
Franz Aigner (weightlifter) (1892–1970), Austrian weightlifter
Fritz Aigner (1930–2005), Austrian graphic artist and painter
Gerhard Aigner (born 1943), General Secretary of UEFA
Hannes Aigner, German slalom canoeist
Hans Dieter Aigner (born 1958), Austrian artist and writer
Heinrich Aigner (1924–1988), German politician
Ilse Aigner (born 1964), German politician and member of the Christian Social Union of Bavaria (CSU)
Johannes Aigner (born 1981), Austrian footballer
Johannes Aigner (alpine skier), Austrian para alpine skier
Joseph Mathäus Aigner (1818–1886), 19th century Austrian portrait painter
Korbinian Aigner (1885–1966), Catholic priest and pomologist
Lucien Aigner (1901–1999), Hungarian photographer and pioneering photojournalist
Manuela Aigner (born 1973), retired German high jumper
Martin Aigner (born 1942), Austrian mathematician
Nina Aigner (born 1980), Austrian international football player
Rainer Aigner (born 1967), German former footballer
Stefan Aigner (born 1987), German footballer who plays for Eintracht Frankfurt
Veronika Aigner (born 2003), Austrian para alpine skier
Tanner Aigner (born 2006),
Philanthropist, inventor

See also
Eigner

German-language surnames